The royal spoonbill (Platalea regia) also known as the black-billed spoonbill, occurs in intertidal flats and shallows of fresh and saltwater wetlands in Australia, New Zealand, Indonesia, Papua New Guinea, and the Solomon Islands. (In New Zealand, it is also known by the Māori name .)  It has also been recorded as a vagrant in New Caledonia. The royal spoonbill lives in wetlands and feeds on crustaceans, fish and small insects by sweeping its bill from side to side. It always flies with its head extended. Widespread throughout its large range, the royal spoonbill is evaluated as Least Concern on the IUCN Red List of Threatened Species.

Taxonomy
The renowned ornithologist John Gould first described the royal spoonbill in 1838, naming it Platalea regia and noting its similarity to the Eurasian spoonbill (P. leucorodia). A 2010 study of mitochondrial DNA of the spoonbills by Chesser and colleagues found that the royal and black-faced spoonbills were each other's closest relatives.

Description
The royal spoonbill is a large, white bird with a black, spoon-shaped bill. It is a wading bird and has long legs for walking through water. It eats fish, shellfish, crabs and amphibians, catching its prey by making a side-to-side movement with its bill.

The end of the bill of the royal spoonbill is broader and works more like a pair of tongs than the narrower bill of the yellow-billed spoonbill, which acts like a forceps.

Feeding

The royal spoonbill is carnivorous, catching small animals by sweeping its bill through shallow water and swallowing prey once detected. The bird walks slowly, kicking up debris and small animals from the bottom of the body of water, which it senses and catches with its bill. When an item is sensed, the spoonbill switches to intensive sweeping of a small area. Royal spoonbills also probe submerged plants directly for prey, and seize prey such as spiders above ground. They have also been observed dragging their bills through shallow water alongside them while walking.

Prey items recorded at Lake Cowal include freshwater crustaceans such as the common yabby (Cherax destructor), shrimp of the genus Macrobrachium and family Atyidae, insects, particularly aquatic bugs of the families Notonectidae and Corixidae, fish such as mosquitofish (Gambusia affinis) and goldfish (Carassius auratus), and occasionally freshwater snails and plant material such as medic burr (Medicago polymorpha).

Breeding
When they are breeding, long white plumes grow from the back of their heads and coloured patches appear on the face. The nest is an open platform of sticks in a tree in which the female lays two or three eggs. The chicks hatch after 21 days. The birds are highly sensitive to disturbance in the breeding season. In Australia, whole colonies have been known to desert their eggs after a minor upset.

Gallery

References

Further reading

External links

 BirdLife Species Factsheet

IUCN Red List least concern species
royal spoonbill
Birds of the Lesser Sunda Islands
Birds of Oceania
royal spoonbill